The 2021 Africa U-20 Cup of Nations was the 16th edition of the Africa U-20 Cup of Nations (23rd edition if tournaments without hosts are included), the biennial international youth football tournament organized by the Confederation of African Football (CAF) for players aged 20 and below.
In September 2018, it was decided that the tournament would be hosted by Mauritania. This will be the first edition in Africa U-20 Cup of Nations to have expanded to 12 teams instead of eight. The top four teams of the tournament would have normally qualified for the 2021 FIFA U-20 World Cup in Indonesia as the CAF representatives. However, FIFA decided to cancel the tournament on 24 December 2020 due to COVID-19 pandemic.

The defending champions Mali failed to qualify. Ghana won their 4th title by defeating debutant Uganda in the Final.

Qualification

At the end of the qualification phase, eleven teams will join the hosts Mauritania.

Player eligibility
Players born 1 January 2001 or later are eligible to participate in the competition.

Qualified teams
The following twelve teams qualified for the final tournament.

Note: All appearance statistics count only those since the introduction of final tournament in 1991.

Venues

Squads

Draw
The draw of the final tournament was held on 25 January 2021, 11:00 WAT (UTC+1), at the Hilton Hotel in Cameroon. The twelve teams were drawn into three groups of four teams. The hosts Mauritania were seeded in Group A and allocated to position A1, with Ghana and Burkina Faso, the only teams among the 12 who participated in the last edition of the CAN Total U20 drawn into B1 & C1 positions. All the other teams were in the same level and were  distributed over the three groups.

Match officials
A total of 16 referees and 18 assistant referees were appointed for the tournament.

Referees
 Abdelaziz Bouh (Mauritania)
 Jean Ouattara (Burkina Faso)
 Blaise Yuven Ngwa (Cameroon)
 Samuel Uwikunda (Rwanda)
 Ibrahim Kalilou Traoré (Ivory Coast)
 Messie Jessie Nkounkou Mvoutou (Congo)
 Celso Alvacao (Mozambique)
 Mutaz Ibrahim Al-Shalmani (Libya)
 Pierre Ghislain Atcho (Gabon)
 Mahmood Ali Mahmood Ismail (Sudan)
 Mohamed Ali Moussa (Niger)
 Souleiman Ahmed Djama (Djibouti)
 Adalbert Diouf (Senegal)
 Mahamat Alhadji Allaou (Chad)
 Akhona Makalima  (South Africa)
 Mehrez Melki (Tunisia)

Assistant Referees
 Hamedine Diba (Mauritania)
 Meriem Chedad (Mauritania)
 Samuel Kuria (Kenya)
 Abbes Akram Zerhouni (Algeria)
 Michael Conteh (Sierra Leone)
 Modibo Samake (Mali)
 Tigle Gizaw Belachew (Ethiopia)
 Thomas Kusosa (Zimbabwe)
 Rodrigue Menye Mpele (Cameroon)  
 Jospin Luckner Malonga (Central African Republic)
 Abdoulaye Sylla (Guinea)
 Clemence Kanduku (Malawi)
 Kwasi Brobbey (Ghana)
 Frank John Komba (Tanzania)
 Aymen Ismail (Tunisia)
 Eric Ayimavo (Benin)
 Youssef Wahid Elbosaty (Egypt)
 Adia Cisse  (Senegal)

Group stage

The top two teams of each group advance to the quarter finals along with the two best 3rd placed teams.  

Tiebreakers

Teams are ranked according to points (3 points for a win, 1 point for a draw, 0 points for a loss), and if tied on points, the following tiebreaking criteria are applied, in the order given, to determine the rankings (Regulations Article 71):
Points in head-to-head matches among tied teams;
Goal difference in head-to-head matches among tied teams;
Goals scored in head-to-head matches among tied teams;
If more than two teams are tied, and after applying all head-to-head criteria above, a subset of teams are still tied, all head-to-head criteria above are reapplied exclusively to this subset of teams;
Goal difference in all group matches;
Goals scored in all group matches;
Drawing of lots.

All times are in WAT (UTC+1).

Group A

Group B

Group C

Ranking of third-placed teams

Knockout stage

Quarter finals

Semi finals

Third place

Final

Winners

Awards 
The following awards were given at the conclusion of the tournament:

Team of the Tournament 
Source:

Coach:  Morley Byekwaso

Goalscorers

Final standings
Per statistical convention in football, matches decided in extra time are counted as wins and losses, while matches decided by a penalty shoot-out are counted as draws.

|-
| colspan="11"| Eliminated in the quarter-finals
|-

|-
| colspan="11"| Eliminated in group stage
|-

|}

References

 
2021 FIFA U-20 World Cup qualification
U-20 Cup of Nations
Africa U-20 Cup of Nations
2021
2021 Africa U-20 Cup of Nations
February 2021 sports events in Africa
March 2021 sports events in Africa